Garavand or Geravand or Garawand may refer to:
 Geravand, Kermanshah
 Garavand, Eslamabad-e Gharb, Kermanshah Province
 Garavand-e Bakhtiar, Khuzestan Province
 Garavand-e Sabzi, Khuzestan Province
 Garavand-e Sofla, Khuzestan Province
 Garavand, Lorestan

See also
 Garvand (disambiguation)